Hamidullah Yosufzai ( on 2 December 1981 in Kunduz, Afghanistan) is an Afghan football goalkeeper who currently plays for Shaheen Asmayee F.C. football club in Afghanistan. He is also Afghanistan national football team player, and has 14 caps.

National team

He debuted in national team in SAFF Cup 2009, held in Bangladesh, where he played all three matches. His next 2 caps were against Tajikistan, in November 2010. He was goalkeeper on SAFF 2011.

Honours

Afghanistan
SAFF Championship: 2013

References

External links
Hamidullah Yosufzai picture

Afghan footballers
Living people
Footballers from Kabul
Pashtun people
Afghanistan international footballers
Association football goalkeepers
Shaheen Asmayee F.C. players
1981 births